Bay de Loup (translation: Wolf Bay) is a natural bay on the island of Newfoundland in the province of Newfoundland and Labrador, Canada. It is near the former locality of the same name. The shores of the bay are precipitous, with deep water.

References
 This article includes text incorporated from United States, Permanent Court of Arbitration's "North Atlantic Coast fisheries arbitration: Appendix to the Counter case of the United States before the Permanent Court of Arbitration at The Hague under the provisions of the special agreement between the United States of America and Great Britain concluded January 27, 1909" (1909), a publication now in the public domain.

Bays of Newfoundland and Labrador